Third Manohar Parrikar Ministry is the Council of Ministers in Goa Legislative Assembly headed by Chief Minister Manohar Parrikar. Manohar Parrikar was sworn in as the 10th Chief Minister of Goa state and his government won the vote of confidence in the Goa Legislative Assembly on 16 March 2017. His government won the vote of confidence with the support of 22 MLAs in the 40-member Goa Legislative Assembly. During the trust vote, Parrikar was supported by the 12 MLAs of the Bharatiya Janata Party (Bharatiya Janata Party MLA Sidharth Kuncalienker did not vote since he was the pro tem Speaker), 3 MLAs of the Maharashtrawadi Gomantak Party, 3 MLAs of the Goa Forward Party, 3 Independent MLAs and the sole MLA of the Nationalist Congress Party.

Manohar Parrikar chaired the first meeting of his third Ministry on 17 March 2017.

The third Manohar Parrikar Ministry consists of Cabinet Ministers drawn from the Bharatiya Janata Party, Maharashtrawadi Gomantak Party, Goa Forward Party and also an Independent.

The cabinet dissolved on 17 March 2019 after the death of Manohar Parrikar. Pramod Sawant serving Speaker of the Goa Legislative Assembly was sworn in as Chief Minister of Goa.

Council of Ministers
The following is the list of the third Manohar Parrikar Ministry.

Former Members 

 Francis Dsouza
 Pandurang Madkaikar

Reshuffle
On 24 September 2018, a Cabinet reshuffle led to the removal of Francis D'Souza and Pandurang Madkaikar from the Cabinet. Both had been ill and hospitalised during the reshuffle. Since 25 July 2018, the portfolios allocated to them were being looked after by Chief Minister Manohar Parrikar.

The reshuffle caused the induction of Milind Naik and Nilesh Cabral into the Ministry.

List of ministers (by date)
In March 2017, the Bharatiya Janata Party formed a coalition government with its 14 MLAs, 3 Goa Forward Party MLAs, 3 Maharashtrawadi Gomantak Party 
MLAs, and 3 Independents MLAs.

Second Council of Ministers (24 September 2018–18 March 2019)

Since 19 March 2019
 First Pramod Sawant ministry

References

External links 
 Goa Council Of Ministers 

Bharatiya Janata Party state ministries
Maharashtrawadi Gomantak Party
Goa Forward Party
Goa ministries
2017 establishments in Goa
2019 disestablishments in India
Cabinets established in 2017
Cabinets disestablished in 2019